is a town located in Higashimuro District, Wakayama Prefecture, Japan. , the town had an estimated population of 14,420 in 7622 households and a population density of 79 persons per km².

Geography
Nachikatsuura is located near the southern tip of the Kii Peninsula, in the southeastern tip of Wakayama Prefecture. It faces the Pacific Ocean to the east and its coastline is a typical ria coast with several good natural harbors.  In particular, the port of Katsuura is located in a cove protected by the island of Nakanoshima at its entrance, so it is not affected by rough waves from the sea. The landscape is mountainous, with numerous hot springs. Parts of the city are within the limits of the Yoshino-Kumano National Park and are also within the Kumano area of ​​the UNESCO World Heritage Site  "Sacred Sites and Pilgrimage Routes in the Kii Mountain Range"

Neighboring municipalities
Wakayama Prefecture
 Shingū
Kozagawa
Kushimoto
Taiji

Climate
Nachikatsuura has a Humid subtropical climate (Köppen Cfa) characterized by warm summers and cool winters with light to no snowfall.  The average annual temperature in Nachikatsuura is 16.5 °C. The average annual rainfall is 2596 mm with September as the wettest month. The temperatures are highest on average in August, at around 26.1 °C, and lowest in January, at around 6.8 °C. The area is subject to typhoons in summer.

Demographics
Per Japanese census data, the population of Nachikatsuura has decreased steadily over the past 60 years.

History
The area of the modern town of Nachikatsuura was within ancient Kii Province. Kumano Nachi Taisha, one of the Kumano Sanzan shrines, has been a destination for pilgrims since the Heian period. The villages of Nachi and Katsuura were established with the creation of the modern municipalities system on April 1, 1889. Katsuura was raised to town status on May 1, 1908 and Nachi on August 1, 1934. On April 1, 1955, Nachi and Katsura merged with the neighboring villages of Ukuimura and Wakamura to form the town of Nachikatsuura.  On January 11, 1960 the municipality annexed the villages of Shimosato farther south and Otamura inland up the Ota River.

Government
Nachikatsuura has a mayor-council form of government with a directly elected mayor and a unicameral city council of 10 members. Nachikatsuura collectively with the other municipalities of Higashimuro District contributes two members to the Wakayama Prefectural Assembly. In terms of national politics, the town is part of Wakayama 3rd district of the lower house of the Diet of Japan.

Economy
The economy of Nachikatsuura centers on commercial fishing, agriculture and tourism.

Education
Nachikatsuura has seven public elementary schools and four public middle schools operated by the town government. The town does not have a high school. Kinki University's Fisheries Research Institute Uragami Experiment Station and its Aquatic Culture Seedling Center are located in Nachikatsuura.

Transportation

Railway 
 JR West – Kisei Main Line
  -  -  -  -  - <> -   -

Highways 
  Nachikatsuura-Shingū Road

Local attractions 
Kumano Nachi Taisha
Seiganto-ji
Fudarakusan-ji
Nachi Falls
Kumano Kodō
Shimosato Kofun
Nanki-Katsuura Onsen

Gallery

References

External links 

Towns in Wakayama Prefecture
Populated coastal places in Japan
Nachikatsuura